The Tengku Ampuan Afzan Mosque is the only mosque located at Bandar Indera Mahkota townships in Kuantan, Pahang, Malaysia. This mosque was named after the late Tengku Ampuan Afzan (1933-1988) a first consort of Sultan Ahmad Shah of Pahang.

See also
 Islam in Malaysia

Mosques in Pahang
Kuantan
Mosques completed in 1988
Mosque buildings with domes